Music Rox! is the only album of Moshi Monsters, the online world of adoptable pet monsters for boys and girls aged 6–12 with 65 million registered users in 150 territories worldwide. The album was released on 30 March 2012.

The re-release was called Music Rox! The Original LP, which was created by Related Money.

Track listing

Charts

Weekly charts

Year-end charts

Release history

References

2012 debut albums